"Falling" is a 1977 song by Lenny LeBlanc and Pete Carr. It was their highest-charting single, peaking at number 13 in the United States during the winter of 1978. It was the first of two charting singles from their Midnight Light LP.

"Falling" spent 28 weeks on the American charts. On the Cash Box chart, the song reached number 11. "Falling" also hit number 11 on the Adult Contemporary chart as well as the Canadian Pop Singles chart.

A song originally recorded by LeBlanc in 1976, "Sharing the Night Together," became a bigger hit than "Falling" when covered and released by Dr. Hook in the fall of 1978. (U.S. number 6, Canada number 3)

Chart history

Weekly charts

Year-end charts

References

External links
 

1977 songs
1977 singles
Big Tree Records singles
Songs written by Lenny LeBlanc
Male vocal duets
American soft rock songs